The 1995 Afro-Asian Cup of Nations was the sixth edition of the Afro-Asian Cup of Nations, it was contested between Uzbekistan, winners of the 1994 Asian Games, and Nigeria, winners of the 1994 African Cup of Nations. Nigeria won 4–2 on aggregate.

Qualified teams

Match details

First leg

Second leg

Winners
Nigeria won 4–2 on aggregates.

References

External links
1995 Afro-Asian Cup of Nations - rsssf.com
1995 Afro-Asian Cup of Nations - goalzz.com

Afro-Asian Cup of Nations
Afro-Asian Cup of Nations
Mer
Mer
1995–96 in Nigerian football
1995 in Uzbekistani football
Uzbekistan national football team matches
Nigeria national football team matches
International association football competitions hosted by Uzbekistan
International association football competitions hosted by Nigeria
October 1995 sports events in Asia
November 1995 sports events in Africa